Tarhana herb or Turkish pickling herb, Echinophora sibthorpiana or Echinophora tenuifolia L. subsp. sibthorpiana (Guss.) Tutin (Turkish çörtük), is a herb sometimes used as a flavoring in tarhana and in pickles.  It may also improve the fermentation of tarhana. (Deghirmencioghlu 2005)

The primary essential oils it contains are δ-3-carene, methyleugenol, and α-phellandrene. (Özcan 2003)

Some authors indicate that Hippomarathrum cristatum is the "tarhana herb".

References

Sources
 Nurcan Deghirmencioghlu et al., "Influence of Tarhana Herb on Tarhana Fermentation", Food Technology and Biotechnology 43:2:175–179 (2005)
 M. Özcan, A. Akgül, "Essential oil composition of Turkish pickling herb (Echinophora tenuifolia L. subsp. sibthorpiana (Guss.) Tutin)", Acta Botanica Hungarica 45:1-2:163-167 (May 2003) 

Edible Apiaceae
Herbs
sibthorpiana